ISO 3166-2:ZW is the entry for Zimbabwe in ISO 3166-2, part of the ISO 3166 standard published by the International Organization for Standardization (ISO), which defines codes for the names of the principal subdivisions (e.g., provinces or states) of all countries coded in ISO 3166-1.

Currently for Zimbabwe, ISO 3166-2 codes are defined for 10 provinces.

Each code consists of two parts, separated by a hyphen. The second part is two letters.

Current codes
Subdivision names are listed as in the ISO 3166-2 standard published by the ISO 3166 Maintenance Agency (ISO 3166/MA).

Click on the button in the header to sort each column.

See also
 Subdivisions of Zimbabwe
 FIPS region codes of Zimbabwe

External links
 ISO Online Browsing Platform: ZW
 Provinces of Zimbabwe, Statoids.com

2:ZW
ISO 3166-2
Zimbabwe geography-related lists